Shaista Ahmad Sheehan, Baroness Sheehan is a British politician and life peer.  She was  nominated for a life peerage by Nick Clegg in August 2015.

Public service

Sheehan served as councillor for Kew from 2006 to 2010. She has also stood for Wimbledon at the 2010 and 2015 general election, finishing second and third, as well as the 2012 London Assembly election. She lives in Putney.

She was created a life peer taking the title Baroness Sheehan, of Wimbledon in the London Borough of Merton and of Tooting in the London Borough of Wandsworth on 2 October 2015.

Between 2015 and 2019 she was a member of the House of Lords Select Committee on Energy and the Environment and since July 2019 she has served as a member of the Science and Technology Committee (House of Lords).

References

1959 births
Living people
Liberal Democrats (UK) life peers
British politicians of Pakistani descent
Councillors in the London Borough of Richmond upon Thames
Liberal Democrats (UK) parliamentary candidates
Life peeresses created by Elizabeth II
Alumni of Imperial College London
People from Lahore
Pakistani emigrants to the United Kingdom
Naturalised citizens of the United Kingdom
21st-century English politicians
21st-century English women politicians